Jovica Elezović (born 2 March 1956) is a Serbian former handball coach and player who competed for Yugoslavia in the 1980 Summer Olympics and in the 1984 Summer Olympics.

Club career
Elezović started playing handball for his hometown club Vrbas at the age of 19. He also spent one season with Crvenka, before joining Borac Banja Luka in 1977. Over the years, Elezović established himself as one of the best players in Yugoslavia, helping his team win the championship in the 1980–81 season. He also played with Proleter Zrenjanin for one season, before going abroad.

In 1985, Elezović moved to Germany and signed with Reinickendorfer Füchse. He would also play for fellow German teams TuS Hofweier and TUSEM Essen. Before retiring, Elezović spent one season with Spanish club Cajamadrid.

International career
At international level, Elezović competed for Yugoslavia in two Olympic tournaments, winning the gold medal in 1984. He was also a regular member of the team that won the 1986 World Championship.

Coaching career
After starting his coaching career at his parent club Vrbas, Elezović spent four seasons as head coach of Partizan, winning three consecutive championships (1992–93, 1993–94, and 1994–95) and two successive cups (1992–93 and 1993–94).

Shortly prior to the 1997 World Championship, Elezović was appointed as head coach for FR Yugoslavia.

Personal life
Elezović is the father of fellow handball player Uroš Elezović.

Honours

Player
Borac Banja Luka
 Yugoslav Handball Championship: 1980–81
 Yugoslav Handball Cup: 1978–79

Coach
Partizan
 Handball Championship of FR Yugoslavia: 1992–93, 1993–94, 1994–95, 1998–99
 Handball Cup of FR Yugoslavia: 1992–93, 1993–94, 1997–98

References

External links
 Olympic record
 

1956 births
Living people
People from Vrbas, Serbia
Serbian male handball players
Yugoslav male handball players
Olympic handball players of Yugoslavia
Olympic gold medalists for Yugoslavia
Handball players at the 1980 Summer Olympics
Handball players at the 1984 Summer Olympics
Olympic medalists in handball
Medalists at the 1984 Summer Olympics
Competitors at the 1983 Mediterranean Games
Mediterranean Games gold medalists for Yugoslavia
Mediterranean Games medalists in handball
RK Vrbas players
RK Crvenka players
RK Borac Banja Luka players
RK Proleter Zrenjanin players
Handball-Bundesliga players
Liga ASOBAL players
Expatriate handball players
Yugoslav expatriate sportspeople in Germany
Yugoslav expatriate sportspeople in Spain
Serbian handball coaches
Yugoslav handball coaches
Serbian expatriate sportspeople in Spain
Serbian expatriate sportspeople in Bosnia and Herzegovina